The 1999–2000 Mighty Ducks of Anaheim season was the team's seventh season. The Ducks failed to qualify for the playoffs despite recording 83 Points again.

Off-season

The Ducks made a few changes during the summer, with the focus on improving their scoring depth much like last season.

Ted Donato was acquired from the Ottawa Senators with Antti-Jussi Niemi in exchange for goalie Patrick Lalime on June 18, 1999
The Mighty Ducks acquired Oleg Tverdovsky from the Phoenix Coyotes in exchange for Travis Green on June 26, 1999 in order to give the team more scoring from the blue line since Fredrik Olausson was the only point producing defence man last season. Defense man Mike Crowley would not make the roster with the Ducks although scoring 4 goals and 9 points in 28 games over the last two seasons, being sent to the Long Beach Ice Dogs of the IHL.

Rookies Mike Leclerc and Niclas Havelid earned roster spots. Vitaly Vishnevskiy would be their first choice to get a call up from Cincinnati in case of needing a defense man.

On September 27, five days before the season started the Ducks acquired prospect Ladislav Kohn from the Atlanta Thrashers in exchange for 2000 8th round Draft pick.

Regular season

The season went down very much like the last one. The Mighty Ducks lost their first two games getting shut out both times but won their next two scoring eight goals. Anaheim made an early deal with the Islanders sending Ted Drury to Long Island in exchange for Tony Hrkac, who won the Stanley Cup with Dallas last season. They played very consistent until December 26, 1999 going 18-13-4-1 winning four games in a row in mid December. What seemed like the winning streak they needed quickly turned on its head becoming their longest winless streak going 0-6-1 and being below the .500 mark for the first time this season. Anaheim stayed below that mark until January 26, 2000 when rumors occurred about trading Selanne to give the Ducks more depth in order to make the Play Offs, which looked questionable at that point.

The Ducks did boost their line up though by acquiring Kip Miller from Pittsburgh on January 29. Ironically, the Ducks had a five-game unbeaten streak which began in Pittsburgh and going 7-3-4 since Kip Miller's acquisition by February 29. In early March Anaheim struggled to keep up with Edmonton and San Jose going 1-3-2-1 and winless the last four games during that stretch until March 15. The Ducks then again made a Play Off push winning the next three games but going 3-4-0-1 after that streak in their last eight games thus missing the post season by 4 points. Since the Mighty Ducks never were out of the Play Off picture fans and experts criticized General Manager Pierre Gauthier's decision not to obtain a player with some scoring touch (Sergei Krivokrasov and Brendan Morrison were dealt at the trading deadline). Late acquisitions Ed Ward and Jorgen Jonsson had no impact, each scoring only one goal though Ward brought some physical play with him, which was needed after the Ducks waived Jim McKenzie in mid January 2000.

Anaheim's biggest problem was their Penalty Killing : the Mighty Ducks struggled a lot short-handed during the regular season, as they had the lowest penalty-kill percentage in the NHL at 79.05%. The Defense did a good job ranking seventh in the west but their bad Penalty Kill resulted in allowing 21 more goals than last season which cost them the Play Offs. Offensively their defence men scored 43 goals compared to 25 goals last season, contributed by Olausson and Tverdovsky for a combined 30 goals. Both goalies had another very solid season though their SV% was down compared to the previous year. Hebert recorded his second best GAA of his career and fifth straight season with three or more shutouts. Their Offense relied on their first line again combining for 94 goals (109 goals last season) but saw more secondary scoring from other players as Cullen, Aalto and Nielsen improved their goal and point totals while Mike Leclerc had a solid rookie season with 19 points. Marty McInnes missed 20 games, which was a factor their Powerplay was good but nowhere near the dominance of last season ranking 14th with a percentage of 16,57%.

Final standings

Schedule and results

Player statistics

Regular season
Scoring

Goaltending

Awards and records

Transactions

Acquired Tony Hrkac and Dean Malkoc from the New York Islanders for Ted Drury on October 29, 1999

Waived Jim McKenzie, claimed off waivers by the Washington Capitals on January 20, 2000

Acquired Kip Miller from the Pittsburgh Penguins for a 2000 9th round Draft pick on January 29, 2000

Acquired Jorgen Jonson from the New York Islanders for Johan Davidson on March 11, 2000

Acquired Ed Ward from the Atlanta Thrashers for a 2001 7th round Draft pick on March 14, 2000

Traded Dan Trebil to the Pittsburgh Penguins for a 2000 5th round Draft pick on March 14, 2000

Acquired Corey Hirsch from the Nashville Predators for future considerations on March 14, 2000

Draft picks
Anaheim's draft picks at the 1999 NHL Entry Draft held at the FleetCenter in Boston, Massachusetts.

Farm teams
Cincinnati Mighty Ducks

See also 
1999–2000 NHL season

References

Anaheim Ducks seasons
Anaheim
Anaheim
Mighty Ducks of Anaheim
Mighty Ducks of Anaheim